This list is of rodent species that are extinct − no longer alive.

Species from related groups such as Lagomorpha (rabbits and hares) are not included.

Before 1500

Extinct after 1500

16th century
Oriente cave rat
Torre's cave rat
Imposter hutia
Montane hutia
Megaoryzomys
Cuban coney
Hispaniolan edible rat
Conilurus capricornensis
Samaná hutia
Buhler's coryphomys
Noronhomys
Pennatomys nivalis
Desmarest's hutia

17th century
Insular cave rat
Puerto Rican hutia
Verhoeven's giant tree rat

See also
 – all periods

References

.
Rodents
.
Extinct rodents
Rodents, extinct